Central Motor Co., Ltd. was a Japanese manufacturer of cars within the Toyota Group. It was founded on 4 September 1950 by Ryuichi Tomiya. The company operated five plants, all located in Japan. It was one of the biggest export vehicle manufacturers of the concern. In July 2012 it was merged with two other Toyota subsidiaries operating in Tohoku to form Toyota Motor East Japan.

History
In 1950, employees of the Kamata Plant were made redundant after it was closed down by Toyota. They founded Central Motors that year and began producing light commercial vehicles for Toyota in 1956. In 1959, Toyota acquired the company and moved the production from Kamata to Sagamihara which would later also become the headquarters base. The company opened various facilities for auto parts production. A new assembly plant and headquarters were built in Ohira, Miyagi. The new facility started production in January 2011 and the Sagamihara plant was closed later that year.

On 1 July 2012, three Toyota subcontractors (Central Motors, Toyota Motors Tohoku and Kanto Auto Works) were combined into a single company, with all their manufacturing facilities and assets renamed as Toyota Motor East Japan, Inc.

After the merger of the three former companies, the corporate headquarters was established at the former Central Motors site in Miyagi. There were just over 1,500 employees at the Central Motors location.

Operations
At closing, Central Motors operated the following facilities:

Ohira, Miyagi (headquarters)
Ohira, Miyagi (car assembly plant)
Wakayanagi, Miyagi (auto parts plant)

Central Motors mainly manufactured vehicles meant for export to Europe or North America. Special vehicles such as police, fire department vehicles as well as campers were produced by the company. Production also included CKD kits of the Toyota Tundra.

Model gallery

Additional models that have no pictures yet: 
Toyota Dyna (1957–1959)
Toyopet Type FS Ambulance (1961–1968)
Toyopet Corona Mark II PickUp (1968–1971)
Toyopet Crown Station Wagon (1973–1974)
Toyopet Corona Van (1970–1973)
Toyota Carina Surf (1982–1987)
Toyota Tundra (CKD kits only)

Notes

References

External links 
 

Car manufacturers of Japan
Toyota subsidiaries
Companies based in Miyagi Prefecture
Vehicle manufacturing companies established in 1950
Japanese companies established in 1950
Ōhira, Miyagi